Cheryl Moana Marie Nunes (born 17 May 1971 in Oregon, U.S.) is a television presenter, former Oakland Raiderette, beauty pageant winner, and musician.

Early life
Nunes was born on 17 May 1971 in Hillsboro, Oregon. She was named for the John Rowles song "Cheryl Moana Marie". Soon after her birth, her parents, both from Hawaii, decided to move the family back to the Island of Kaua'i.

Career
Her first performances were at an early age, in school plays and local music competitions. By the age of 14, she was chosen to perform at Disneyland, Japan, at the World Gala Event in Tokyo.

By age 17, she won several beauty contests including, Miss Kauai America (the youngest winner of this title), and placing in the top five of the Miss Hawaii America competition. During her reign as Miss Kauai America, she began modeling for Sports Illustrated photographer, Bob Coello. She later moved to Los Angeles and competed in Miss California USA where she placed top five and won the coveted title as Miss Asia USA.

She was selected to be a Los Angeles Raiderette and continued with the team when they moved to Oakland in 1995 to become an Oakland Raiderette. She sang the Star Spangled Banner, for the Los Angeles Lakers, Ice Dogs Hockey League, Los Angeles Dodgers, NHRA and the Toyota Grand Prix of Long Beach. She also recorded the theme song for Hawaiian Tropic, "Come With Me".

She was asked to record for Sony International - John Kalodner, J Records - Clive Davis, G funk Camp and Virgin Records, which led to Cheryl becoming one of Luis Miguel's back-up singers touring the US as well as Mexico, Puerto Rico, Dominican Republic among other countries.

She was an on-air presenter for the STARZ movie channel conducting interviews with, Antonio Banderas, Ice Cube, Cedric the Entertainer, Lucy Liu, Raquel Welch, Matthew Perry, Mary Wilson and The Funk Brothers of MoTown. She also recorded ads for Dominican Republic Tourism Bureau, Clairol Shampoo and MTV Network. She later worked with Mattel when their Hawaiian Barbie was introduced in Beverly Hills.

She has appeared in 15 national commercials including: Miller Genuine Draft Beer, Mervyns, FedEx, Heineken Beer, GMC Motors, Albertsons, Taco Bueno. She is 'Bond Girl' Dominique Paradis in James Bond 007: Nightfire. She has booked modeling ads for La Jolla Swimwear, Bridal Magazine and Hinano Beer Tahiti.

She released an EP album on iTunes, CD Baby and 33 other distribution sites.

Cheryl and her family appeared on ABC's Celebrity Wife Swap on January 31, 2012. She traded places on the show with WWE wrestler Mick Foley's wife, Colette Foley.

Personal life 

In May 2011, Nunes gave birth to her first child, a son named Antonio Kamakanaalohamaikalani Harvey Sabàto, with Italian American model and actor Antonio Sabàto Jr. The couple met in Hawaii during the filming of the VH1 reality TV show, My Antonio. Sabàto has two children, son Jack and daughter Mina, from previous relationships. Their son was named for his father while his middle name, an uncommon name of Hawaiian origin meaning "the beloved gift from the Heavens," was given in honor of Nunes' Native Hawaiian heritage. Nunes and Sabàto married in Hawaii on 25 September 2012 and Sabàto filed for divorce on 20 December 2016, citing irreconcilable differences. Nunes alleged that Sabàto revealed to her that he'd been struggling with prescription drug abuse following a car accident and that, in the past, he was addicted to crystal meth.

References

External links

Living people
Musicians from Hillsboro, Oregon
People from Hawaii
American pageant participants of Filipino descent
American people of Portuguese descent
American people of Chinese descent
American people of Native Hawaiian descent
American beauty pageant winners
Native Hawaiian people of Filipino descent
National Football League cheerleaders
American female models
American television hosts
American cheerleaders
1971 births
Singers from Oregon
21st-century American singers
21st-century American women singers
American women television presenters